Anna Ulrica Ericsson (born 30th of December 1966) is a Swedish actress.

Ericsson made her debut as actress as she studied at high school in Gösta Jansson's local revues. She met the playwright Bo Sigvard Nilsson at the recreation center. Ericsson studied at the stage school in Malmö 1987–90 and except the studies she has spent one year in Buffalo, United States, where she studied drama. After that she has been engaged at Borås City Theatre, Stockholm City Theatre and Helsingborg City Theatre.

Filmography
Wallander – Hämnden (2009)
 2006 – Mästerverket
 2005 – Kvalster
Sex, hopp & kärlek (2005)
Four Shades of Brown (2004)
Beck – Öga för öga (1998)
 1998 – Rederiet
Beck – Vita nätter (1998)
Beck – Pensionat Pärlan (1997)
Beck – Mannen med ikonerna (1997)
Beck – Lockpojken (1997)
 1995 – Som löven i Vallombrosa
Chefen fru Ingeborg (1993)

References

External links

1966 births
Swedish film actresses
Swedish television actresses
Swedish stage actresses
Living people